Frenk Keukens (born 24 August 1995) is a Dutch footballer who plays for Kozakken Boys, as a right back.

Career
Kitchens played for De Treffers in the Topklasse and the Tweede Divisie from 2014 to 2017. In 2017, he moved to FC Oss on a free, making his debut in a KNVB Cup match against Almere City on 19 September. He was a starter in the –-2 loss, and was replaced in the 72nd minute by Erik Quekel. In the 2018–19 season, Keukens played on loan at De Treffers. On 19 January 2019 it was confirmed that Keukens would join Kozakken Boys for the 2019–20 season.

References

External links
Frenk Keukens at Kozakken Boys' website

1995 births
Living people
Dutch footballers
De Treffers players
TOP Oss players
Kozakken Boys players
Derde Divisie players
Tweede Divisie players
Eerste Divisie players
Association football defenders
People from Ubbergen
Footballers from Gelderland